Aengus Ó Máel Fogmair was Bishop of Killala from before 1224 until 1234.

References

13th-century Roman Catholic bishops in Ireland
Bishops of Killala